Sava (sometimes Sava bei Littai) is a settlement on the left bank of the Sava River (from which it gets its name) in central Slovenia. It lies in the Municipality of Litija. The area is part of the traditional region of Upper Carniola. It is now included with the rest of the municipality in the Central Sava Statistical Region.

Church

The parish church in the settlement is dedicated to Saint Nicholas and belongs to the Roman Catholic Archdiocese of Ljubljana. It was built in 1736 on the site of an earlier church and extended in 1844.

References

External links

Sava on Geopedia

Populated places in the Municipality of Litija